Glucose transporters are a wide group of membrane proteins that facilitate the transport of glucose across the plasma membrane, a process known as facilitated diffusion. Because glucose is a vital source of energy for all life, these transporters are present in all phyla. The GLUT or SLC2A family are a protein family that is found in most mammalian cells. 14 GLUTS are encoded by human genome. GLUT is a type of uniporter transporter protein.

Synthesis of free glucose
Most non-autotrophic cells are unable to produce free glucose because they lack expression of glucose-6-phosphatase and, thus, are involved only in glucose uptake and catabolism. Usually produced only in hepatocytes, in fasting conditions, other tissues such as the intestines, muscles, brain, and kidneys are able to produce glucose following activation of gluconeogenesis.

Glucose transport in yeast 
In Saccharomyces cerevisiae glucose transport takes place through facilitated diffusion. The transport proteins are mainly from the Hxt family, but many other transporters have been identified.

Glucose transport in mammals
GLUTs are integral membrane proteins that contain 12 membrane-spanning helices with both the amino and carboxyl termini exposed on the cytoplasmic side of the plasma membrane. GLUT proteins transport glucose and related hexoses according to a model of alternate conformation, which predicts that the transporter exposes a single substrate binding site toward either the outside or the inside of the cell. Binding of glucose to one site provokes a conformational change associated with transport, and releases glucose to the other side of the membrane. The inner and outer glucose-binding sites are, it seems, located in transmembrane segments 9, 10, 11; also, the DLS motif located in the seventh transmembrane segment could be involved in the selection and affinity of transported substrate.

Types
Each glucose transporter isoform plays a specific role in glucose metabolism determined by its pattern of tissue expression, substrate specificity, transport kinetics, and regulated expression in different physiological conditions. To date, 14 members of the GLUT/SLC2 have been identified. On the basis of sequence similarities, the GLUT family has been divided into three subclasses.

Class I
Class I comprises the well-characterized glucose transporters GLUT1-GLUT4.

Classes II/III
Class II comprises:
GLUT5, a fructose transporter in enterocytes
GLUT7, found in the small and large intestine, transporting glucose out of the endoplasmic reticulum
GLUT9 -
GLUT11

Class III comprises:
 GLUT6, 
 GLUT8, 
 GLUT10,
 GLUT12, and 
 GLUT13, also H+/myo-inositol transporter HMIT, primarily expressed in brain.

Most members of classes II and III have been identified recently in homology searches of EST databases and the sequence information provided by the various genome projects.

The function of these new glucose transporter isoforms is still not clearly defined at present. Several of them (GLUT6, GLUT8) are made of motifs that help retain them intracellularly and therefore prevent glucose transport. Whether mechanisms exist to promote cell-surface translocation of these transporters is not yet known, but it has clearly been established that insulin does not promote GLUT6 and GLUT8 cell-surface translocation.

Discovery of sodium-glucose cotransport
In August 1960, in Prague, Robert K. Crane presented for the first time his discovery of the sodium-glucose cotransport as the mechanism for intestinal glucose absorption. Crane's discovery of cotransport was the first ever proposal of flux coupling in biology. Crane in 1961 was the first to formulate the cotransport concept to explain active transport. Specifically, he proposed that the accumulation of glucose in the intestinal epithelium across the brush border membrane was [is] coupled to downhill Na+ transport cross the brush border. This hypothesis was rapidly tested, refined, and extended [to] encompass the active transport of a diverse range of molecules and ions into virtually every cell type.

See also
Cotransport
Cotransporter
GLUT1 deficiency syndrome

References

External links
 

Transport proteins
Integral membrane proteins
Solute carrier family